Jeffrey Buis (born 27 December 2001) is a Dutch motorcycle racer. In 2020 he became the world champion on the Estoril Circuit in the Supersport 300 category.

Career 
Buis made his debut at the Yamaha R3 Cup in 2018, winning his inaugural race. The second round of the Yamaha R3 Cup took place on the Oschersleben track, where he obtained second place.

On 7 December 2018, Dutch outfit MTM Motoport announced Buis and Dion Otten as their new riders for the 2019 Supersport 300 World Championship, in addition to Scott Deroue and Robert Schotman, all equipped with Kawasaki Ninja 400s.

In his debut season in a world championship, Buis achieved an eighth place as his best finish at the Magny-Cours circuit and finished the season in fourteenth position overall. He continued in the Supersport 300 world championship also in the 2020 season, always with the MTM Motoport team. He obtained his first podium, a second place, in race 1 of the Portimão grand prix, in a race interrupted by a red flag a few laps from the end, when Ana Carrasco led the race, was followed by Buis who was only 0.057s behind second and with the third classified more than four seconds off the lead. On August 29, Buis took his first pole position and won his first race during the Aragon grand prix and the next day he won his second consecutive race.

Supersport World Championship

Races by year 
(key) (Races in bold indicate pole position, races in italics indicate fastest lap)

 Season still in progress.

Supersport 300 World Championship

Races by year
(key) (Races in bold indicate pole position; races in italics indicate fastest lap)

References

Living people
2001 births
Dutch motorcycle racers